Garnier is a surname commonly found in France and Quebec, originally from the first name Garnier of Germanic etymology Warin-hari, like Werner. 
Garnier de Nablus was a master of the Knights Hospitalier, commander under Richard I in the Third Crusade.
Local and dialectal French variations include Gasnier, Grenier, Guernier, Varnier, Vernier, Warnier, Warniez, Wargniez, Wargnier and Warnéry. Garnier is a common name in France, although not as much in Quebec. The name can also be found in the Netherlands. The name came to Maastricht through Wallonia in the 17th century and spread across the country from there.

List of persons with the surname
 Charles Garnier (architect), 19th-century French architect
 Charles Garnier (missionary), Jesuit missionary martyred in Canada in 1649
 Claude Garnier  (1535–1589), Renaissance-era printer of popular literature
 Edward Garnier, British politician
 Francis Garnier, French explorer
 Geoffrey Sneyd Garnier, English artist and printmaker
 Jacques Garnier (1755–1817/18),  French revolutionary.
 Jean Garnier, 17th-century patristic scholar
 Joseph Garnier (1813–1881), French economist and politician
 Joseph-François Garnier, French oboist and composer
 Laurent Garnier, French musician and DJ
 Mark Garnier, British politician
 Octave Garnier, French anarchist
 Robert Garnier, French poet
 Séan Garnier, French freestyle footballer
 Thierry Garnier, French businessman, CEO of Kingfisher
 Tony Garnier (architect), French architect
 Tony Garnier (musician), American bassist

See also
 Garnier (disambiguation)

Surnames
French-language surnames